Yes Remixes is a remix album featuring the songs of progressive rock band Yes and was released in 2003.  Taking material harking back from 1970's Time and a Word to 1980s Drama, Virgil Howe a.k.a. "The Verge" (and son of Steve Howe) re-imagined Yes's music into a techno context, dramatically altering the band's sound. Although it briefly dented the remix sales charts, the album failed to chart at all in the regular listings.

Track listing

Yes Remixes (Rhino 78186) failed to chart in the UK or US.

References

Yes (band) remix albums
Albums produced by Eddy Offord
2003 remix albums
Rhino Records remix albums